Smooth Radio is a network of local radio stations broadcasting on FM and MW stations in the United Kingdom.  Smooth Radio features a Soft Adult Contemporary radio format. Launched in March 2014, it replaced the national Smooth Radio that had launched in 2010 on FM, and most outlets of Gold on MW.

Each FM station broadcasts localised breakfast with networked shows simulcast from London at all other times. Three of the six FM stations, and all eighteen AM frequencies, are owned and operated by Global, with the remaining three FM licences owned by Bauer Media Audio Ireland and run as a franchise.

According to RAJAR, the network broadcasts to a combined weekly audience of 5.1 million with a listening share of 3.7% as of December 2022.

In January 2023, Smooth introduced a new logo and slogan, "Always the best music".

Background

Having previously operated under a number of regional licences, Smooth Radio's owners, GMG Radio merged its five English stations into one quasi-national station, launching the brand on the Digital One national DAB network on 4 October 2010. Most of the output was broadcast from Salford Quays in Manchester, with other programming coming from Castlereagh Street in London.

On 25 June 2012, GMG Radio's owners, Guardian Media Group sold its radio division to Global at an estimated price of between £50 million and £70 million.  Global renamed GMG Radio "Real and Smooth Radio Ltd." Several rival radio groups expressed their concerns over the takeover and the effect it could have on commercial radio in the UK. Ofcom launched a review of the sale, and it was announced that GMG Radio and Global would continue to operate as separate entities while the review was conducted. On 3 August the Culture Secretary Jeremy Hunt instructed Ofcom and the Office of Fair Trading (OFT) to examine Global's purchase of GMG, which gave Global over 50% of the UK radio market because of concerns the takeover may not be in the public interest. On 11 October, the OFT concluded that the merger could lead to a rise in local advertising costs because of the decrease in competitors, and forwarded the matter to the Competition Commission, which oversees business mergers and takeovers. On the same day the Competition Commission announced it would publish its findings into the takeover by 27 March 2013.

The Competition Commission published its final report into the acquisition on 21 May 2013, requiring Global to sell radio stations in seven locations. Global subsequently appealed the decision, but this was rejected by the Competition Appeal Tribunal in November. Global announced in December that it would not contest the decision, and would instead begin the process of selling the assets as directed by the commission. On 4 February 2014, the Radio Today website reported that Ofcom had given Global permission to remove Smooth from the Digital One platform, and to replace it with a service playing music from the 1970s, 80s and 90s. Under this agreement, Smooth would continue to broadcast on its regional frequencies, but would be required to provide seven hours of local output per day. On 6 February, Global confirmed the sale of eight of its regional stationsincluding those with the Smooth Radio brand in the North West, North East and East Midlandsto the Irish media holdings company Communicorp. Under a franchising agreement between the two firms, these stations would retain the Smooth Radio name, but relaunch airing a mixture of both regional content and networked programming from London. Smooth would also take over Gold's medium wave frequencies, except in London, Manchester and the East Midlands. Global announced later that month that Smooth would be relaunched on 3 March, and subsequently confirmed the Gold changes would take effect from 24 March, when the stations would begin simulcasting with Smooth Radio London. This also coincided with the return of local programming at breakfast and drivetime.

On 5 March 2018, Global added the former Lakeland Radio station to the network as Smooth Lake District following its purchase from the CN Group for an undisclosed fee.

Local weekend afternoon programming ended on 25 August 2019. Angie Greaves was announced as the new host of the national Smooth Drive Home, which began broadcasting on 2 September.

Current notable presenters

Jenni Falconer (Smooth London breakfast & Saturday mid-morning)
Kirsty Gallacher (Saturday afternoon)
Angie Greaves (The Smooth Drive Home weekdays and Sunday mid-morning)

Tina Hobley (Sunday afternoon)
Myleene Klass (Saturday afternoon)
Margherita Taylor (Sunday afternoon)
Kate Garraway (weekday mid-mornings)

List of Smooth Radio stations
The Smooth network comprises 24 stations:

Stations across the UK
FM stations produce and broadcast local programming from local studios from 6-10am weekdays. All AM stations carry networked programming content as broadcast from London, with the exception that the two stations in Wales carry a local opt-out programme from noon to 4pm on weekdays, as they had done under Gold. Many of the FM/AM stations, but not all, are also on DAB where this is provided in their coverage area. Digital TV platforms carry the Smooth UK version of Smooth, also now transmitted nationwide on Digital One in DAB+ – this carries the network programming output of Smooth London at all times, with national news and advertising.

FM radio stations

AM radio stations
 

The Smooth AM frequencies in Peterborough and Northampton, which had switched from Gold to Smooth as part of the 2014 reallocation, reverted to carrying Gold programming in 2019 as a result of Communicorp's relaunch of Connect FM as part of Smooth East Midlands.

DAB (former AM areas)
In several areas, local Smooth services have ceased transmitting on AM (usually due to the closure of transmitter sites) but continued to be provided on digital radio. These variants, being the siblings of Heart/Capital stations which remain available on FM, continue to follow the AM model of localised advertising and information alongside networked programming content, rather than taking Smooth UK as heard in other areas served only via digital.
 Smooth Berkshire and North Hampshire – was 1431/1485 AM (switched off 15 May 2015)
 Smooth Bristol and Bath – was 1260 AM (switched off 10 Feb 2016)
 Smooth Herts, Beds and Bucks – was 792/828 AM (switched off 2 Nov 2020)
 Smooth South Wales – was 1305/1359 AM (switched off 12 Oct 2020)

In addition, the former Gold in Exeter/Torbay, which continued to operate on DAB after the closure of its AM transmission, transitioned to Smooth with the rest of the AM network in 2014.

Smooth UK
 DAB+ via Digital One (Except Oxford & N.Ireland)
Digital TV – Sky 0128, Virgin Media 916, Freeview 718, Freesat 732

Sister stations

Smooth Country
A country music radio station which, having launched as an online stream through Global Player and the Smooth website in March 2019, was established as a broadcast radio service on 3 September 2019. It has a presented weekday daytime show (hosted at launch by Eamonn Kelly) and the service was added to a number of local DAB multiplexes, replacing The Arrow in London, Chill in the East Midlands, and Gold elsewhere.

Smooth Chill

This mellow and chillout music service launched on 3 September 2019, replacing Chill in the Global portfolio. The station is available in the DAB+ format in London, and was made available online through Global Player (which had not carried the prior Chill service) and the Smooth Radio website, with the Chill URL redirected to point to the Smooth site.  The station re-launched nationally on 8 April 2020 on Digital One, broadcasting in 32kbs DAB+.

Smooth Extra
Smooth Radio also operated Smooth Extra, with the slogan Your Refreshing Music Mix. The station transmitted its own non-stop music output from 10am to 6pm every day, and relayed Smooth London at other times.

Smooth Extra launched in December 2014 as a result of the removal of the prior network Smooth service from Digital One (during November and December the slot had been used for Smooth Christmas). Originally broadcast in mono in the traditional DAB format, Smooth Extra and Heart Extra switched to stereo DAB+ transmission in summer 2019, enabling the addition of Gold and Heart Dance to the Digital One multiplex in the released capacity.

Smooth Extra was also broadcast on the Sky satellite TV system (channel 0146) from 1 October 2015, taking over the slot from The Arrow (which had itself replaced Real Radio there the year before, due to Real Radio stations becoming Heart). Smooth Extra was replaced by Heart Dance on 7 October 2019.

Smooth Extra and Heart Extra, closed at midnight on Thursday 12 March 2020 and was replaced with a national feed of Smooth on Digital One.

See also
Timeline of Smooth Radio

Notes

References

External links

 
British radio networks
Radio stations established in 1990
1990 establishments in the United Kingdom